Elbeyli, formerly Alimantar, is a town and the administrative seat of Elbeyli District in the Kilis Province in Turkey. The town is inhabited by Turkmens of the Elbegli tribe and had a population of 1,974 in 2022.

References

External links 
 District governorate 

Populated places in Kilis Province